The 2015 Northwestern Wildcats football team represented Northwestern University during the 2015 NCAA Division I FBS football season. It was Pat Fitzgerald's tenth season as the team's head coach. The Wildcats home games were played at Ryan Field in Evanston, Illinois. They were members of the West Division of the Big Ten Conference. They finished the season 10–3, 6–2 in Big Ten play to finish in a tie for second place in the West Division. They were invited to the Outback Bowl where they were defeated by Tennessee 45–6.

Previous season
The 2014 Northwestern Wildcats football team finished the regular season 5–7, 3–5 in Big Ten play to finish in a tie for fifth place in the West Division. They had highlight wins against #18 Notre Dame and #17 Wisconsin.

Schedule
Northwestern announced their 2015 football schedule on June 3, 2013. The 2015 schedule consist of 7 home and 5 away games in the regular season. The Wildcats will host Big Ten foes Iowa, Minnesota, Penn State, and Purdue and will travel to Illinois, Michigan, Nebraska, and Wisconsin.

The Wildcats hosted three of their four non conference games against Ball State, Eastern Illinois and Stanford. Northwestern traveled to Durham, North Carolina to face Duke of the Atlantic Coast Conference on September 19.

Schedule Source:

Rankings

Roster

References

Northwestern
Northwestern Wildcats football seasons
Northwestern Wildcats football